"A Hero's Death" is a song by Irish post-punk band, Fontaines D.C. The song is the lead single, and title track off their sophomore album. The song was released on 5 May 2020 through Partisan Records.

"A Hero's Death" was the band's first song to chart, reaching number 30 in Scotland and number 67 in the UK Singles Downloads Chart.

Music video 
The music video for the song was directed by Hugh Mulhern and produced by Aaron McEnaney and Theresa Adebiyi. The music video features a fictional late night show called The Georgie Barnes Show starring a charismatic talk show host named Georgie Barnes, (played by Aidan Gillen) whose co-host is a puppet. The series features the talk show host greeting the band prior to them playing a song on the show, but becoming existential when the band seems to show more appreciation to the puppeteer (Bryan Quinn) and the puppet rather than the host.

Live performances 
The first live performance of the song came on July 12, 2020 on Later... with Jools Holland when the band performed the song. Due to the COVID-19 pandemic, the band members performed in different locations and were simulcasted for an "At Home" performance of the song. The first live performance of the band together was on January 28, 2021 when the band performed on The Tonight Show Starring Jimmy Fallon.

Charts

References

External links 
 
 

2020 songs
2020 singles
Partisan Records singles
Fontaines D.C. songs